(Bhalgam) Baldhoi  is a village and former non-salute princely state in Gujarat, western India.

Village 
Modern Baldhoi lies in Jasdan Taluka of Rajkot district, on Saurasthra peninsula.

It includes the site of a deserted village called Bhalgam close to the foot of the Baldhua hill.

Etymology 

There is a hill nearby known as the Baldhua hill. According to a legend, a laden bullock belonging to a Brinjari ascended this steep hill nearly 900 feet high, and died on the summit. A temple has been built on the spot and the hill was hereafter called Baldhua from baladh - a bullock. For the same reason the village is called Baldhoi.

History 
Bhalgam Baldhoi was a petty princely state, comprising solely the village, in the Halar prant of Kathiawar.

Bhalgam Baldhoi had a population of 617 in 1901, yielding a state revenue of 9,168 Rupees (1903-4, mostly from land) and a paying a tribute of 262 Rupees, to the British an Junagadh State.

It was held by Vala Kathi Chieftains, also during British period. It was subject to the Lodhika thana.

References

External links and Sources 
History
 Imperial Gazetteer, on dsal.uchicago.edu
 
 This article incorporates text from a publication now in the public domain: 

Princely states of Gujarat
Kathi princely states
Villages in Rajkot district